Merry & Happy is the reissue of South Korean girl group Twice's first studio album, Twicetagram. The Christmas-inspired album was released on December 11, 2017. In addition to the original track listing, it has two new songs: the first track is titled "Heart Shaker" and the eponymous second track "Merry & Happy" was written by Park Jin-young. The album and "Heart Shaker" debuted at No. 1 on four charts of Gaon—Album Chart and Digital Chart, Download Chart and Social Chart respectively, while "Merry & Happy" entered and peaked at No. 24 on Digital Chart.

Twice performed both "Heart Shaker" and "Merry & Happy" on music programs—Music Bank, Show! Music Core and Inkigayo on December 15–17, respectively. The music video of "Merry & Happy" was set for release on December 21, but was uploaded online the next day instead in respect to Kim Jong-hyun, whose burial service was held on December 21.

Track listing

Content production
Credits adapted from album liner notes.

Locations

 Recording
 JYPE Studios, Seoul, South Korea
 Studio Instinct, Seoul, South Korea
 E.one Sound, Seoul, South Korea
 Heavymental Studios, Seoul, South Korea
 NUPLAY Studio, Seoul, South Korea
 Studio567, Seoul, South Korea
 Banzak Studio, Seoul, South Korea

 Mixing
 Mirrorball Studios, North Hollywood, California
 JYPE Studios, Seoul, South Korea
 Studio Sean, Seoul, South Korea
 Cube Studio, Seoul, South Korea

 Mastering
 Honey Butter Studio, Seoul, South Korea
 Sterling Sound, New York City, New York
 821 Sound Mastering, Seoul, South Korea

Personnel

 J. Y. Park "The Asiansoul" – producer
 Lee Ji-young – direction and coordination (A&R)
 Jang Ha-na – music (A&R)
 Kim Yeo-joo (Jane Kim) – music (A&R)
 Park Sun-hyeong – music (A&R)
 Kim Ji-hyeong – production (A&R)
 Choi A-ra – production (A&R)
 Kim Je-na (Jenna Kim) – production (A&R)
 Gong Da-yoon – production (A&R)
 Kim Bo-hyeon – design (A&R)
 Kim Tae-eun – design (A&R), web design, album art direction
 Choi Hye-jin – recording, mixing and assistant mixing engineer
 Eom Se-hee – recording and assistant mixing engineer
 Jang Han-soo – recording and assistant mixing engineer
 Friday of Galactika – recording engineer and chorus (on "Heart Shaker")
 Jowul – recording engineer, vocal producer (on "Merry & Happy"), vocal director and background vocals (on "24/7")
 Jeong Ho-hyun – recording engineer, all instruments and keyboard (on "Turtle" and "You in My Heart")
 Earattack – recording engineer, and all instruments and computer programming (on "Missing U" and "Rollin'")
 bass (on "Missing U"), background vocals (on "Rollin'") and director (on "Don't Give Up")
 Jeong Gyu-chang – recording engineer
 Kevin Oppa (mr. cho) – recording engineer, vocals producer (on "Love Line"), computer programming, piano and digital editing (on "Jaljayo Good Night")
 Frants – recording engineer, all instruments and computer programming (on "Look at Me")
 Tony Maserati – mixing engineer
 James Krausse – mixing engineer
 Lee Tae-seob – mixing engineer
 Lim Hong-jin – mixing and assistant mixing engineer
 Staytuned – mixing engineer
 Yoon Won-kwon – mixing engineer
 Jossi Ahjussi – mixing engineer
 Jeon Bu-yeon – assistant mixing engineer
 Bae So-yoon – assistant mixing engineer
 Park Jeong-eon – mastering engineer
 Chris Gehringer – mastering engineer
 Kwon Nam-woo – mastering engineer
 Naive Production – video director
 Kim Young-jo – video executive producer
 Yoo Seung-woo – video executive producer
 Choi Pyeong-gang – video co-producer
 Kim Young-joon at Agency SEED – photographer
 Kang Hye-in at Normallogic – album design
 Kang Hye-in at Normallogic – album design
 Choi Hee-seon at F. Choi – style director
 Son Eun-hee at Lulu – hair and makeup director
 Jung Nan-young at Lulu – hair and makeup director
 Choi Ji-young at Lulu – hair and makeup director
 Jo Sang-ki at Lulu – hair and makeup director
 Zia at Lulu – hair and makeup director
 Jeon Dal-lae at Lulu – hair and makeup director
 Won Jung-yo – makeup director
 Yoon Hee-so – choreographer
 Kang Da-sol – choreographer
 Today Art – printing
 David Amber – all instruments, computer programming (on "Heart Shaker")
 Avenue 52 – all instruments, additional programming (on "Heart Shaker")
 Galactika – vocal director (on "Heart Shaker")
 e.Na – chorus (on "Heart Shaker")
 Joe Lawrence – all instruments, computer programming (on "Merry & Happy")
 Jihyo of Twice – background vocals (on "Merry & Happy", "Likey", "Ding Dong" and "Love Line")
 Nayeon of Twice – background vocals (on "Merry & Happy" and "Likey")
 Kim Cho-young – background vocals (on "Merry & Happy")
 Rado – all instruments, computer programming and background vocals (on "Likey")
 Choi Hoon – bass (on "Turtle" and "You in My Heart")
 Yoon Tae-woong – guitar (on "Turtle" and "You in My Heart")
 Kim Yoon-ji – chorus (on "Turtle")
 Kim Jong-seong – guitar (on "Missing U")
 Nam Joo – background vocals (on "Missing U", "FFW" and "Rollin'")
 Jeong Yoo-ra at Cassette08 – digital editing (on "Missing U", "Rollin'" and "Don't Give Up")
 Jeong Dong-hwan & Park Ji-yong & Nusoul – keyboards (on "Wow")
 Kriz – background vocals (on "Wow")
 Park Gi-tae – guitar (on "Wow")
 NAOtheLAIZA – all instruments and computer programming (on "FFW")
 Antti Hynninen – all instruments and computer programming (on "Ding Dong")
 Caesar & Loui – all  instruments and computer programming (on "24/7")
 Oh Han-sol – background vocals (on "Look at Me")
 Hyerim – background vocals (on "Look at Me")
 Fox Stevenson – all instruments and computer programming (on "Rollin'")
 Bin – background vocals (on "Rollin'" and "Don't Give Up")
 Darren Smith – all instruments and computer programming (on "Love Line")
 Chris Wahle – all instruments and computer programming (on "Don't Give Up")
 Kim So-ri – chorus (on "You in My Heart")
 Kim Jun-soo – guitar (on "Jaljayo Good Night")
 Lee Da-jeong – background vocals (on "Jaljayo Good Night")

Charts

Weekly charts

Year-end charts

Accolades

Release history

References

2017 Christmas albums
Pop Christmas albums
Reissue albums
Twice (group) albums
JYP Entertainment albums
Genie Music albums
Korean-language albums
2017 albums